Inmarsat-3 F4 is a communications satellite operated by the British satellite operator Inmarsat. It was launched into a geosynchronous orbit on 4 June 1997. It was located at 54° West longitude whilst in service, providing coverage of the Americas as Atlantic Ocean Region-West (AOR-W). It was replaced by Inmarsat-3 F5 at 54° West in February 2016, and the now retired Inmarsat-3 F4 was moved to parking at 144° West.

Inmarsat-3 F4 was constructed by Lockheed-Martin, using an AS-4000 satellite bus.

In the United States, Inmarsat ground stations are licensed to operate at 1525-1559 MHz and 1626.5-1660.5 MHz via a mechanism called the ISAT List. The 1544-1545 MHz and 1645.5-1646.5 MHz bands are reserved for safety and distress communications.

See also 

 1997 in spaceflight

References

External links 
 Our Satellites - Inmarsat
 http://www.boeing.com/news/releases/2005/q4/nr_051108s.html
 http://www.as.northropgrumman.com/products/aa_inmarsat/index.html 

Spacecraft launched in 1997
Communications satellites in geostationary orbit
Inmarsat satellites